The women's 20 kilometres race walk event at the 2005 European Athletics U23 Championships was held in Erfurt, Germany, on 15 July.

Medalists

Results

Final
15 July

Participation
According to an unofficial count, 18 athletes from 12 countries participated in the event.

 (2)
 (1)
 (1)
 (1)
 (1)
 (3)
 (1)
 (3)
 (1)
 (2)
 (1)
 (1)

References

20 kilometres race walk
Racewalking at the European Athletics U23 Championships